Cashel Cairn is a cairn and National Monument located in County Mayo, Ireland.

Location

References

National Monuments in County Mayo
Archaeological sites in County Mayo